Kilian Ludewig (born 5 March 2000) is a German professional footballer who plays as a right-back for Danish Superliga club AaB, on loan from Red Bull Salzburg.

Club career

Early years
Ludewig started playing football at Barsbütteler SV and Willinghusener SC before moving to the youth academy of FC St. Pauli in 2014. After just one year, he moved on to RB Leipzig. In November 2015, he made his debut for Leipzig's under-19 team in the Under 19 Bundesliga when he came off the bench for Przemysław Płacheta on the tenth matchday of the 2015–16 season against Hamburger SV in injury time. In December 2015, he made his first appearance for Leipzig's under-17 team in the Under 17 Bundesliga against VfL Wolfsburg. In August 2016, he scored his first three goals in the Under 17 Bundesliga in an 8–0 win against Niendorfer TSV.

Ludewig was officially promoted to the under-19 ahead of the 2017–18 season. He scored his first goal in the Under 19 Bundesliga in August 2017 in a 2–0 victory against Hertha BSC. Between September and December 2017, he also played three games for RB Leipzig in the UEFA Youth League.

Red Bull Salzburg
Ludewig joined Austrian Football Bundesliga club Red Bull Salzburg in June 2018, signing a four-year contract. He was also initially available for selection by reserve team FC Liefering. He made his debut for Liefering in September 2018 in a game against FC Juniors OÖ.

Loans
After having only appeared for Liefering through one-and-a-half seasons, Ludewig joined Barnsley on loan on 9 January 2020. After making 18 games for Barnsley in the EFL Championship and avoiding relegation, the loan was extended for another season in August 2020.

After another four second-tier appearances for Barnsley, however, the loan was terminated prematurely in October 2020 and Ludewig was loaned to German Bundesliga club Schalke 04 for the remainder of the season. A few days earlier, Manuel Baum, under whom Ludewig had played in the national under-20 side, had taken over as head coach of Schalke. In Gelsenkirchen Ludewig only made six league appearances as he had missed a large part of the season due to a metatarsal fracture suffered in December 2020. Schalkern suffered a historic relegation at the end of the season.

After one-and-a-half years on loan in England and Germany, Ludewig returned to Salzburg for the 2021–22 season. There, he made his debut in the Bundesliga in October 2021 against LASK. However, this remained his only appearance for Salzburg beside one appearance in an Austrian Cup game against SKN St. Pölten.

On 13 January 2022, Ludewig was loaned to Willem II in Eredivisie until the end of the season. In Tilburg, however, he was also unable to assert himself and was only utilised four times in the Eredivisie. The club suffered relegation at the end of the season.

On 24 June 2022, Ludewig was sent on a one-season loan to Danish Superliga club AaB.

Career statistics

References

External links

 
 
 

2000 births
Living people
German footballers
Association football defenders
Germany youth international footballers
Germany under-21 international footballers
FC Liefering players
RB Leipzig players
FC Red Bull Salzburg players
Barnsley F.C. players
FC Schalke 04 players
AaB Fodbold players
English Football League players
2. Liga (Austria) players
Bundesliga players
Danish Superliga players
Austrian Football Bundesliga players
German expatriate footballers
German expatriate sportspeople in Austria
Expatriate footballers in Austria
German expatriate sportspeople in England
Expatriate footballers in England
German expatriate sportspeople in the Netherlands
Expatriate footballers in the Netherlands
German expatriate sportspeople in Denmark
Expatriate men's footballers in Denmark
Footballers from Hamburg